Andreas Seppi was the defending champion; however, he didn't take part in these championships this year.
Lukáš Rosol won in the final 6–1, 4–6, 7–6(3), against Benedikt Dorsch.

Seeds

Draw

Final four

Top half

Bottom half

External links
 Main Draw
 Qualifying Draw

Internazionali di Tennis di Bergamo - Singles
2009 Singles